Oliver Fix (born 21 June 1973 in Augsburg) is a German slalom canoeist who competed at the international level from 1990 to 1996. He won a gold medal in the K1 event at the 1996 Summer Olympics in Atlanta.

Fix also won gold medals in the K1 and K1 team events at the 1995 ICF Canoe Slalom World Championships in Nottingham.

His wife Gilda Montenegro competed for Costa Rica in two Summer Olympics in the women's slalom K1 event. Her best finish was 26th in Barcelona in 1992.

World Cup individual podiums

References 

DatabaseOlympics.com profile

Wallechinsky, David and Jamie Loucky (2008). "Canoeing: Women's Kayak Slalom Singles". In The Complete Book of the Olympics: 2008 Edition. London: Aurum Press Limited. pp. 495–6.

1973 births
Canoeists at the 1996 Summer Olympics
German male canoeists
Living people
Olympic canoeists of Germany
Olympic gold medalists for Germany
Olympic medalists in canoeing
Medalists at the 1996 Summer Olympics
Sportspeople from Augsburg
Medalists at the ICF Canoe Slalom World Championships